Beat the Burglar is a BBC television programme that uses ex-professional burglar Mike Fraser to break into people's homes with their permission to show how vulnerable they can be. Forensic teams then harvest the evidence for analysis by experts before giving the homeowners a home security makeover.

Mike shows them what a real burglary would be like while they watch from a camera.

Firstly he shows them how easy it is to enter their homes, then he takes their prized possessions. Later he returns the items and tells them how they can improve security in their homes. At the end of the show their home's security is improved and the ex-burglar returns to see whether they have beaten the burglar.

Beat the Burglar is presented by Dominic Littlewood.

Series 1 which consists of 15 episodes, was first broadcast on BBC One on 8 November 2004, and ended on 28 January 2005.

Series 2 which consists of 10 episodes, was first broadcast on BBC One on 19 September 2005, and ended on 30 September 2005.

See also
 It Takes a Thief (2005 TV series) – A similar US TV series.

References

External links

BBC Television shows
2004 British television series debuts
2005 British television series endings